Henry Warren Ogden (October 21, 1842 – July 23, 1905) was a member of the United States House of Representatives for Louisiana's 4th congressional district.

Biography
He was born in Abingdon in Washington County in far southwestern Virginia. In 1851, he moved with his parents to Warrensburg in Johnson County in west central Missouri, where he attended common schools.

During the American Civil War, he joined the Confederate States of America Army, despite living in a state that had remained within the Union. He rose to the rank of lieutenant. Ogden was a first lieutenant of Company D, Sixteenth Regiment, Missouri Infantry, and afterward on the staff of Brigadier General Lewis, Second Brigade, Parsons’ division, Missouri Infantry. He was captured and held for one year as a prisoner of war. On June 8, 1865, he was paroled at Shreveport in Caddo Parish in northwestern Louisiana. There he remained and became a wealthy planter in adjacent Bossier Parish.

In 1879, Ogden was a member of the Louisiana constitutional convention and was elected to the Louisiana House of Representatives from Bossier Parish. He was the Speaker from 1884 to 1888. In 1894, he won a special election as a Democrat to the United States House of Representatives. The vacancy was created by the resignation of Newton C. Blanchard. Ogden was reelected to the Fifty-fourth and Fifty-fifth Congresses, having served from May 12, 1894, to March 3, 1899. He left Congress in 1899 to return to his farm and died six years later in Benton, the Bossier Parish seat of government.

References

1842 births
1905 deaths
Confederate States Army officers
American Civil War prisoners of war
Democratic Party members of the Louisiana House of Representatives
Speakers of the Louisiana House of Representatives
Politicians from Abingdon, Virginia
People from Warrensburg, Missouri
American planters
Politicians from Shreveport, Louisiana
People from Bossier Parish, Louisiana
Democratic Party members of the United States House of Representatives from Louisiana
19th-century American politicians
Southern Historical Society